Calanthe, commonly known as Christmas orchids, is a genus of about 220 species of orchids in the family Orchidaceae. They are evergreen or deciduous terrestrial plants with thick roots, small oval pseudobulbs, large corrugated leaves and upright, sometimes arching flowering stems. The sepals and petals are narrow and a similar size to each other and the labellum usually has spreading lobes.

Description
Orchids in the genus Calanthe are terrestrial with small, crowded pseudobulbs with thick roots and a few corrugated or wrinkled leaves with the base tapering to a petiole-like stalk. Some species are evergreen while others are deciduous. The flowers are delicate but showy, white, pink, yellow or orange and crowded near the end of an erect, sometimes arching flowering stem. The sepals and petals are relatively narrow, similar in size and spread widely. The labellum has three or four spreading lobes and in most species there is a spur at the base. Unlike similar orchids, the labellum of Calanthe orchids is fused to the column.

Taxonomy and naming
The genus Calanthe was first formally described in 1821 by Robert Brown and his manuscript was published in The Botanical Register. The name Calanthe is derived from the Ancient Greek words kallos meaning "beauty" and anthos meaning "flower".

Distribution and habitat
Calanthe species are found in all tropical areas, but mostly concentrated in Southeast Asia. Some species also range into subtropical and tropical lands such as China, India, Madagascar, Australia, Mexico, Central America, the West Indies and various islands of the Pacific and Indian Oceans.

List of species
The following is a list of species of Calanthe recognised by the Plants of the World Online as at August 2018:

 Calanthe abbreviata (Blume) Lindl.
 Calanthe aceras Schltr.
 Calanthe africana M.W.Chase, Christenh. & Schuit.
 Calanthe alba W.Suarez & Cootes
 Calanthe albolutea Ridl.
 Calanthe alismifolia Lindl.
 Calanthe alleizettei Gagnep.
 Calanthe alpina Hook.f. ex Lindl.
 Calanthe alta Rchb.f.
 Calanthe amboinensis (Blume) M.W.Chase, Christenh. & Schuit.
 Calanthe angustifolia (Blume) Lindl.
 Calanthe aquamarina Schuit. & de Vogel
 Calanthe arcuata Rolfe
 Calanthe arfakana J.J.Sm.
 Calanthe argenteostriata C.Z.Tang & S.J.Cheng
 Calanthe arisanensis Hayata
 Calanthe aristulifera Rchb.f.
 Calanthe aruank P.Royen
 Calanthe aurantiaca Ridl.
 Calanthe aureiflora J.J.Sm.
 Calanthe averyanoviana M.W.Chase, Christenh. & Schuit.
 Calanthe baconii (J.J.Sm. & Shim) M.W.Chase, Christenh. & Schuit.
 Calanthe balansae Finet
 Calanthe baliensis J.J.Wood & J.B.Comber
 Calanthe beamanii P.J.Cribb
 Calanthe beleensis Ormerod & P.J.Cribb
 Calanthe bicalcarata J.J.Sm.
 Calanthe biloba Lindl.
 Calanthe bingtaoi J.W.Zhai, L.J.Chen & Z.J.Liu
 Calanthe bivalvis P.J.Cribb & Ormerod
 Calanthe borneensis (J.J.Sm.) M.W.Chase, Christenh. & Schuit.
 Calanthe brassii Ormerod
 Calanthe brevicornu Lindl.
 Calanthe burkei P.J.Cribb
 Calanthe calanthoides (A.Rich. & Galeotti) Hamer & Garay in F.Hamer
 Calanthe callosa (Blume) M.W.Chase, Christenh. & Schuit.
 Calanthe camptoceras Schltr.
 Calanthe cardioglossa Schltr.
 Calanthe carrii Govaerts
 Calanthe caulescens J.J.Sm.
 Calanthe caulodes J.J.Sm.
 Calanthe ceciliae Rchb.f.
 Calanthe celebica Rolfe
 Calanthe chevalieri Gagnep.
 Calanthe chloroleuca Lindl.
 Calanthe chrysoglossoides J.J.Sm.
 Calanthe clavata Lindl.
 Calanthe clavicalcar J.J.Sm.
 Calanthe claytonii P.J.Cribb
 Calanthe coiloglossa Schltr. in K.M.Schumann & C.A.G.Lauterbach
 Calanthe columnaris (C.Z.Tang & S.J.Cheng) M.W.Chase, Christenh. & Schuit.
 Calanthe conspicua Lindl.
 Calanthe coodei P.J.Cribb
 Calanthe cooperi (Rolfe) M.W.Chase, Christenh. & Schuit.
 Calanthe cootesii Naive
 Calanthe corymboides (Schltr.) M.W.Chase, Christenh. & Schuit.
 Calanthe cremeoviridis J.J.Wood
 Calanthe crenulata J.J.Sm.
 Calanthe crispifolia Ormerod
 Calanthe cruciata Schltr.
 Calanthe crumenata Ridl.
 Calanthe crystallina P.J.Cribb
 Calanthe curvatoascendens Gilli
 Calanthe daenikeri (Kraenzl.) M.W.Chase, Christenh. & Schuit.
 Calanthe davaensis Ames
 Calanthe davidii Franch.
 Calanthe daymanensis Ormerod & P.J.Cribb
 Calanthe decora M.W.Chase, Christenh. & Schuit.
 Calanthe delavayi Finet
 Calanthe densiflora Lindl.
 Calanthe devogelii P.J.Cribb & D.A.Clayton
 Calanthe discolor Lindl.
 Calanthe dolichopoda Fukuy
 Calanthe dulongensis H.Li, R.Li & Z.L.Dao
 Calanthe duyana Aver.
 Calanthe ecalcarata (J.J.Sm.) M.W.Chase, Christenh. & Schuit.
 Calanthe ecallosa J.J.Sm.
 Calanthe ecarinata Rolfe ex Hemsl.
 Calanthe emeishanica K.Y.Lang & Z.H.Tsi
 Calanthe engleriana Kraenzl. in K.M.Schumann & C.A.G.Lauterbach
 Calanthe epiphytica Carr
 Calanthe fargesii Finet
 Calanthe ferruginea M.W.Chase, Christenh. & Schuit.
 Calanthe finisterrae Schltr.
 Calanthe fissa L.O.Williams
 Calanthe flava (Blume) C.Morren
 Calanthe floresana P.J.Cribb
 Calanthe forbesii Ridl.
 Calanthe formosana Rolfe
 Calanthe fragrans P.Royen
 Calanthe francoisii (Schltr.) M.W.Chase, Christenh. & Schuit.
 Calanthe fugongensis X.H.Jin & S.C.Chen
 Calanthe geelvinkensis J.J.Sm.
 Calanthe gibbsiae Rolfe
 Calanthe goodenoughiana Ormerod & P.J.Cribb
 Calanthe graciliflora Hayata
 Calanthe graciliscapa Schltr.
 Calanthe grandiflora Nadeaud
 Calanthe grata (Blume) M.W.Chase, Christenh. & Schuit.
 Calanthe griffithii Lindl.
 Calanthe gustavii M.W.Chase, Christenh. & Schuit.
 Calanthe habbemensis Ormerod & P.J.Cribb
 Calanthe hainanensis (C.Z.Tang & S.J.Cheng) M.W.Chase & Schuit.
 Calanthe halconensis Ames
 Calanthe hancockii Rolfe
 Calanthe hattorii Schltr.
 Calanthe hekouensis (Tsukaya, M.Najak. & S.K.Wu) M.W.Chase, Christenh. & Schuit.
 Calanthe henryi Rolfe
 Calanthe herbacea Lindl.
 Calanthe himalaicum Raskoti
 Calanthe hirsuta Seidenf.
 Calanthe hololeuca Rchb.f. in B.Seemann
 Calanthe hoshii S.Kobay.
 Calanthe humblotii (Rchb.f.) M.W.Chase, Christenh. & Schuit.
 Calanthe hyacinthina Schltr.
 Calanthe imthurnii Kores
 Calanthe indigofera (Hassk.) M.W.Chase, Christenh. & Schuit.
 Calanthe indochinensis (Seidenf. & Ormerod) M.W.Chase, Christenh. & Schuit.
 Calanthe inflata Schltr.
 Calanthe insularis S.H.Oh, H.J.Suh & C.W.Park
 Calanthe izu-insularis (Satomi) Ohwi & Satomi in J.Ohwi
 Calanthe johorensis Holttum
 Calanthe judithiae P.J.Cribb
 Calanthe jusnerii Boxall ex Náves in F.M.Blanco
 Calanthe kaniensis Schltr.
 Calanthe kemulensis J.J.Sm.
 Calanthe kermodei Ormerod & Kurzweil
 Calanthe keshabii Lucksom
 Calanthe kinabaluensis Rolfe
 Calanthe kooshunensis Fukuy.
 Calanthe labiata (J.J.Sm.) M.W.Chase, Christenh. & Schuit.
 Calanthe labrosa (Rchb.f.) Rchb.f.
 Calanthe lacerata Ames
 Calanthe laciniata (Ormerod) M.W.Chase, Christenh. & Schuit.
 Calanthe lambii P.J.Cribb
 Calanthe lamellosa Rolfe
 Calanthe lancilabris Ormerod & P.J.Cribb
 Calanthe landyae (P.J.Cribb & J.V.Stone) M.W.Chase, Christenh. & Schuit.
 Calanthe lechangensis Z.H.Tsi & Tang
 Calanthe leonidii P.J.Cribb & D.A.Clayton
 Calanthe leucosceptrum Schltr.
 Calanthe leuseri P.J.Cribb
 Calanthe ligo P.J.Cribb
 Calanthe limprichtii Schltr.
 Calanthe longgangensis Y.S.Huang & Yan Liu
 Calanthe longibracteata Ridl.
 Calanthe longicornu (Guillaumin) M.W.Chase, Christenh. & Schuit.
 Calanthe longifolia Schltr.
 Calanthe longipes Hook.f.
 Calanthe lutea (Ursch & Toill.-Gen. ex Bosser) M.W.Chase, Christenh. & Schuit.
 Calanthe lyonii (Ames) M.W.Chase, Christenh. & Schuit.
 Calanthe lyroglossa Rchb.f.
 Calanthe madagascariensis Rolfe ex Hook.f.
 Calanthe mannii Hook.f.
 Calanthe maquilingensis Ames
 Calanthe masuca (D.Don) Lindl.
 Calanthe maxii P.O'Byrne
 Calanthe mcgregorii Ames
 Calanthe metoensis Z.H.Tsi & K.Y.Lang
 Calanthe micrantha Schltr.
 Calanthe microglossa Ridl.
 Calanthe millikenii P.J.Cribb
 Calanthe millotae Ursch & Genoud ex Bosser
 Calanthe mindorensis Ames, Philipp. J. Sci.
 Calanthe mishmensis (Lindl. & Paxton) M.W.Chase, Christenh. & Schuit.
 Calanthe moluccensis J.J.Sm.
 Calanthe monophylla Ridl.
 Calanthe montana (Schltr.) M.W.Chase, Christenh. & Schuit.
 Calanthe morotaiensis (Ormerod & Juswara) Schuit.
 Calanthe musa-amanii J.J.Wood
 Calanthe nana (Hook.f.) M.W.Chase, Christenh. & Schuit.
 Calanthe nankunensis Z.H.Tsi
 Calanthe nguyenthinhii Aver.
 Calanthe nicolae P.O'Byrne
 Calanthe nipponica Makino
 Calanthe nivalis Boxall ex Náves in F.M.Blanco
 Calanthe obcordata (Lindl.) M.W.Chase, Christenh. & Schuit.
 Calanthe obreniformis J.J.Sm.
 Calanthe odora Griff.
 Calanthe okinawensis Hayata
 Calanthe oreadum Rendle
 Calanthe otuhanica C.L.Chan & T.J.Barkman
 Calanthe ovalifolia Ridl.
 Calanthe ovata Ridl.
 Calanthe parvilabris Schltr.
 Calanthe pauciflora (Blume) M.W.Chase, Christenh. & Schuit.
 Calanthe pauciverrucosa J.J.Sm.
 Calanthe pavairiensis Ormerod
 Calanthe perrottetii A.Rich.
 Calanthe petelotiana Gagnep.
 Calanthe peyrotii (Bosser) M.W.Chase, Christenh. & Schuit.
 Calanthe philippinensis (N.E.Br.) M.W.Chase, Christenh. & Schuit.
 Calanthe plantaginea Lindl.
 Calanthe poiformis P.J.Cribb & Ormerod
 Calanthe polyantha Gilli
 Calanthe puberula  Lindl.
 Calanthe pulchella (Kraenzl.) M.W.Chase, Christenh. & Schuit.
 Calanthe pulchra (Blume) Lindl.
 Calanthe pullei J.J.Sm.
 Calanthe punctata Kurzweil
 Calanthe reflexilabris J.J.Sm.
 Calanthe reflexipetals (J.J.Wood & Shim) M.W.Chase, Christenh. & Schuit.
 Calanthe rhodochila Schltr.
 Calanthe rigida Carr
 Calanthe robertsii (F.Muell.) M.W.Chase, Christenh. & Schuit.
 Calanthe rosea (Lindl.) Benth.
 Calanthe rubens Ridl.
 Calanthe rubra S.H.Oh, H.J.Suh & C.W.Park
 Calanthe ruthiae (P.T.Ong & P.O'Byrne) Schuit.
 Calanthe ruttenii J.J.Sm.
 Calanthe saccata J.J.Sm.
 Calanthe sacculata Schltr.
 Calanthe salaccensis J.J.Sm.
 Calanthe sandsii P.J.Cribb
 Calanthe scaposa Z.H.Tsi & K.Y.Lang
 Calanthe secunda P.J.Cribb
 Calanthe seranica J.J.Sm.
 Calanthe siargaoensis M.Leon, Naive & Cootes
 Calanthe sieboldopsis B.Y.Yang & Bo Li
 Calanthe simplex Seidenf.
 Calanthe simulans (Rolfe) M.W.Chase, Christenh. & Schuit.
 Calanthe sinica Z.H.Tsi
 Calanthe solomonensis P.J.Cribb & D.A.Clayton
 Calanthe spathoglottoides Schltr.
 Calanthe speciosa (Blume) Lindl.
 Calanthe steinhardtiana (Senghas) M.W.Chase, Christenh. & Schuit.
 Calanthe stella P.J.Cribb
 Calanthe stenocentron (Schltr.) M.W.Chase, Christenh. & Schuit.
 Calanthe striata R.Br. ex Spreng.
 Calanthe subtriloba (Ames & C.Schweinf.) M.W.Chase, Christenh. & Schuit.
 Calanthe succedanea Gagnep.
 Calanthe sylvatica (Thouars) Lindl.
 Calanthe taenioides J.J.Sm.
 Calanthe tahitensis Nadeaud
 Calanthe taibaishanensis M.Guo, J.W.Zhai & L.J.Chen
 Calanthe takeoi Hayata
 Calanthe takeuchii Ormerod & P.J.Cribb
 Calanthe tankervilleae (Banks) M.W.Chase, Christenh. & Schuit.
 Calanthe tenuis Ames & C.Schweinf.
 Calanthe testacea M.W.Chase, Christenh. & Schuit.
 Calanthe tetragona (Thoars) M.W.Chase, Christenh. & Schuit.
 Calanthe tonkinensis (Aver.) M.W.Chase, Christenh. & Schuit.
 Calanthe torricellensis Schltr. in K.M.Schumann & C.A.G.Lauterbach
 Calanthe transiens J.J.Sm.
 Calanthe tricarinata Lindl.
 Calanthe trichoneura (Schltr.) M.W.Chase, Christenh. & Schuit.
 Calanthe trifida Tang & F.T.Wang
 Calanthe triplicata (Willemet) Ames
 Calanthe trulliformis King & Pantl.
 Calanthe truncata J.J.Sm.
 Calanthe truncicola Schltr.
 Calanthe tsiana Y.Q.Chen, J.W.Zhai & S.R.Lan
 Calanthe tsoongiana Tang & F.T.Wang
 Calanthe tuberculosa (Thoars) M.W.Chase, Christenh. & Schuit.
 Calanthe uncata Lindl.
 Calanthe undulata J.J.Sm.
 Calanthe unifolia Ridl.
 Calanthe velutina Ridl.
 Calanthe ventilabrum Rchb.f. in B.Seemann
 Calanthe versteegii J.J.Sm.
 Calanthe vestita Wall. ex Lindl.
 Calanthe villosa J.J.Sm.
 Calanthe villosagastris (Thoars) M.W.Chase, Christenh. & Schuit.
 Calanthe wallichii (Lindl.) M.W.Chase, Christenh. & Schuit.
 Calanthe wenshanensis J.W.Zhai, L.J.Chen & Z.J.Liu
 Calanthe whistleri P.J.Cribb & D.A.Clayton
 Calanthe whiteana King & Pantl.
 Calanthe womersleyi P.J.Cribb & Ormerod
 Calanthe woodfordii (Hook.) M.W.Chase, Christenh. & Schuit.
 Calanthe woodii P.J.Cribb
 Calanthe wuxiensis H.P.Deng & F.Q.Yu
 Calanthe yaoshanensis Z.X.Ren & H.Wang
 Calanthe yueana Tang & F.T.Wang
 Calanthe yuksomnensis Lucksom
 Calanthe zollingeri Rchb.f.

Gallery

References

External links
 

 
Collabieae genera
Taxa named by Robert Brown (botanist, born 1773)